Neil Hunter (born 10 May 1936) is a South African cricketer. He played in ten first-class matches for Border from 1961/62 to 1968/69.

See also
 List of Border representative cricketers

References

External links
 

1936 births
Living people
South African cricketers
Border cricketers
Cricketers from East London, Eastern Cape